Das Boot (German for "The Boat") is the first album by German dance group U96, released in 1992.  The track "Das Boot" is a cover version of the title theme of the 1981 German film Das Boot, composed by Klaus Doldinger. The name of the group (U96) is a reference to the film.

Track listing

1992 release: Polydor / 513 185-1 
 "Das Boot" – 5:14
 "Come 2 Gether" – 3:49
 "Der Kommandant" – 3:12
 "Art of U96" – 4:30
 "I Wanna Be a Kennedy" – 5:31
 "Ambient Underworld" – 3:51
 "Sporty Animal-Loving Extrovert" – 3:00
 "Sonar Sequences" – 6:00
 "Bonus Track, Das Boot (Klassik Version) – 1:59

1992 release: Polydor / 513 185-2
 "Das Boot" – 5:14
 "Come 2 Gether" – 3:49
 "Der Kommandant" – 3:12
 "No Control" - 4:30
 "Art of U96" – 4:14
 "I Wanna Be a Kennedy" – 5:31
 "Ambient Underworld" – 3:51
 "Sporty Animal-Loving Extrovert" – 3:00
 "Sonar Sequences" – 6:00
 "Bonus Track, Das Boot (Klassik Version) – 1:59

Charts

Weekly charts

Year-end charts

See also
 Das Boot (novel), a novel by Lothar-Günther Buchheim from 1973
 Das Boot (TV series), a German television series sequel to the 1981 film
 Das Boot (video game), a 1991 video game inspired by the novel of the same name

References

1992 debut albums
U96 albums
Polydor Records albums
Techno